I've Been Trying to Tell You is the tenth studio album by English alternative dance band Saint Etienne, released on 10 September 2021 through Heavenly Recordings. The album is set between the "optimistic" years of 1997 and 2001, and contains samples of pop songs from this time along with related field recordings. It was accompanied by a short film directed by photographer Alasdair McLellan that premiered at a BFI Southbank event on 3 September.

Background
The album marks the band's first sample-based record since So Tough (1993). Bob Stanley described it as "about optimism, and the late nineties, and how memory is an unreliable narrator".

Critical reception
I've Been Trying to Tell You received a weighted average score of 83 out of 100 from eight reviews on Metacritic, indicating "universal acclaim". Tim Sendra of AllMusic called it "a concept album that looks to extract the optimistic sound of late '90s mainstream pop and twist it into a suite of songs that feel like the half-remembered afterimages of a dream". Reviewing the album for Pitchfork, Jesse Dorris wrote that the album "feels passive, lost in nostalgia for an age it hasn't fully reckoned with".

Track listing

Sample credits
 "Music Again" samples "Love of a Lifetime" by Honeyz (1998).
 "Pond House" samples "Beauty on the Fire" by Natalie Imbruglia (2001).
 "Fonteyn" samples "Raincloud" by Lighthouse Family (1997).
 "Little K" samples "'Til the Night Becomes the Day" by Samantha Mumba (2000).
 "Penlop" samples "Joy" by the Lightning Seeds (1990).
 "Broad River" samples "Ripped Inside" by Tasmin Archer (1992).

Charts

References

2021 albums
Heavenly Recordings albums
Saint Etienne (band) albums
Ambient pop albums
Sound collage albums